The National Coast Guard Museum is a museum planned for construction in New London, Connecticut, an historic seaport at the mouth of the Thames River on Long Island Sound that is the home of the United States Coast Guard Academy.

The Coast Guard Museum Association, which has been working to create the Museum since 2001, had hoped to break ground on the building in 2018. However, in 2019 David Collins, staff writer for the New London Day, wrote that the Museum, "keeps slipping deadlines, year by year, and it's beginning to look like it could sink hopelessly underwater before any rescue is mobilized."

Construction of the museum officially started August 19th, 2022 with a "keel laying ceremony".

The Coast Guard and the Space Force are the only two out of America's six service branches that do not yet have a dedicated museum; the Army, Marines, Navy and Air Force already have museums.

The Museum has been given a site on the Thames River by the City of New London.

The federal government has committed $30 million, and the State of Connecticut has committed $20 million to construct a pedestrian bridge necessary to provide pedestrian access to the Museum over the main railroad track connecting New York and Boston.  The Museum Association expects to raise the bulk of the necessary funds from private donations.  In 2019 Lockheed Martin, which owns the locally manufactured Sikorsky Helicopters, pledged $1 million.

The proposed five or six-story, 80,000 square feet building will include an outdoor concert pavilion where the United States Coast Guard Band and other groups can give concerts.

References

External links
 Coast Guard Museum website

Proposed museums in the United States
United States Coast Guard
Naval museums in the United States
History of the United States Coast Guard
Military and war museums in Connecticut
Maritime museums in Connecticut